Myrciaria glazioviana, the cabeluda, or yellow jaboticaba, is a species of plant in the family Myrtaceae.

Distribution 
Myrciaria glazioviana endemic to the states of Rio de Janeiro and Minas Gerais in south-eastern Brazil. The plant has also been found in Pernambuco and Bahia in north-eastern Brazil.

Description 
Myrciaria glazioviana is a tree or shrub that can grow to between 4 and 7 metres tall, with leaves between 7 and 11 cm long. It produces edible, yellow, fuzzy and spherical fruit with one or two seeds.

References

glazioviana
Crops originating from the Americas
Crops originating from Brazil
Tropical fruit
Flora of South America
Endemic flora of Brazil
Fruits originating in South America
Cauliflory
Fruit trees
Berries